Oostkerke Castle is a castle in Damme, Belgium. The castle can be found south of the village Oostkerke, and was constructed in the 14th century.

See also
List of castles in Belgium

Castles in Belgium
Castles in West Flanders
Damme